John Richard Suomi (born October 5, 1980) is a Canadian former professional baseball player.

Career
Suomi attended University College of the Cariboo. The Oakland Athletics selected Suomi in the 22nd round of the 2000 MLB draft. He played in the minor league system of the Athletics through 2004, missed 2005 because of injury and then played in the organizations of the Washington Nationals, Philadelphia Phillies and Kansas City Royals.

International career
Suomi played for the Canadian national baseball team in the 2013 World Baseball Classic.

References

External links

1980 births
Living people
Arizona League Athletics players
Baseball catchers
Baseball players from Toronto
Canadian expatriate baseball players in the United States
Canadian people of Finnish descent
Clearwater Threshers players
Columbus Clippers players
Harrisburg Senators players
Kane County Cougars players
Lehigh Valley IronPigs players
Lynchburg Hillcats players
Modesto A's players
Northwest Arkansas Naturals players
Omaha Royals players
Reading Fightin Phils players
Reading Phillies players
Thompson Rivers University
Vancouver Canadians players
Visalia Oaks players
World Baseball Classic players of Canada
2013 World Baseball Classic players